The Hitch-hiker's Guide to Europe was a travel guide, by "Australian expatriate" Ken Welsh and first published in 1971 in the UK by Pan Books. A first American edition was published in 1972 by Stein and Day, New York, NY, USA. The book has been described as "providing valuable guidance for either the first-timer or the repeater" in Europe, the Eastern Bloc nations, Turkey, North Africa, and the Middle East and a "guide and compendium of advice for seeing Europe by the skin of your teeth".

Contents

Countries/regions
Factual information on specific countries/regions was broken down into (using the book's original chapter headings):

 England
 Wales
 Scotland
 Northern Ireland
 Ireland
 France
 Belgium
 the Netherlands
 West Germany
 Luxembourg and the Small Countries
 Switzerland
 Austria
 Italy
 Spain
 Portugal
 Greece
 Denmark
 Sweden
 Norway
 Finland
 The Communist Countries
 In the 1972 edition, the entire contents of the subsection on Albania were the words "Forget it." 
 Morocco and Northern Africa
 Turkey and the Middle East

Further sections
Further information was broken down into sections on:
 How to hitch (including the warning: "there's a dark side too, and it comes when you're 27 miles from nowhere in the middle of a black night with rain drenching you and you have no tent and no cover")
 When not to hitch
 How to make money go further
 How to get in and out of a strange town and what to do when you're there
 Photography hints
 International Student Identity Cards
 Embassy and Student Association addresses
 Youth Hostels
 Black markets
 Selling and pawning items

Editions
The book is long out of print, though it may be found in used-book shops. Updated editions were printed in 1974, 1975, 1980, 1984, 1986 (with the full title Hitchhiker's Guide to Europe: The 1986 Guidebook for People on a Hitchhiking Budget), and an edition in 1988 had the subtitle "How to See Europe by the Skin of Your Teeth." The book was co-edited by Katie Wood from 1993 and the final edition appeared in 1996.

The book promised that any other ways of saving money would be accepted as a submission by the publishers and printed with a credit in subsequent editions.

U.S. edition
In the US edition's introduction it states that it is possible to survive a trip in Europe on less than twenty-five US dollars per week. The US edition also included such information as US dollar to other currency exchange rates (current as of January 1972), weight and measurement conversion charts, and brief lists of phrases and numbers for French, German, Spanish and Italian.

Criticism
While Hitch-hiker's Guide to Europe, like Let's Go travel guides (1960–) and the Lonely Planet guides (1973–), praised thriftiness, Liz Olsen criticised its advocacy of "stinginess and sneakiness" and noted: "It's alright to try to 'do' Europe on the cheap, but when you must resort to charity soup line-ups in London's Trafalgar Square, or earn money for food while begging, or find yourself sleeping in a wet German graveyard, warily watching for the police", then it would have made more sense to first stay at home and earn enough money to pay for "a sleep and shower in youth hostels".

While accepting Welsh's useful advice for the inpecunious hitchhiker ("if you're broke, pawn your watch; you sell your blood; you sell your sleeping-bag"), Anthony Hern criticises the book's "flippiness" when he "seeks to deal with the conventional", such as the things to see ("In Paris he says of the Notre Dame: 'Worth looking through'").

Legacy
The book was "the first of a wave of budget travel guides that liberated a generation" of young people by providing "priceless information" and "travel inspiration". Similar books and series included the BIT guides (1970), Paul Coopersmith's Rule of Thumb (Simon & Schuster, 1973), Tony Wheeler's Across Asia on the Cheap (Lonely Planet, 1973), and Hilary and George Bradt's Backpacking along Ancient Ways in Peru and Bolivia (Bradt Travel Guides, 1974).

The title of the book inspired the title of Douglas Adams's The Hitchhiker's Guide to the Galaxy.

References

Further reading
 Ken Welsh, Hitch-hiker's guide to Europe : how to see Europe by the skin of your teeth, 11th edition, 1988 - online copy at Wayback Machine
 'The Hitchhiker's Guide To Europe' by Ken Welsh and Katie Wood - the Book at BBC

1971 non-fiction books
British travel books
Travel guide books